The 1933 Toronto Argonauts season was the club's 47th season since its inception in 1873 and its 24th season in the Interprovincial Rugby Football Union. The team finished tied with the Montreal Football Club for first place in the IRFU with an identical record of four wins and two losses, resulting in a two-game, total-points tiebreaker series which the Argos won by an aggregate score of 20-9. By virtue of this victory, the club secured its 7th IRFU championship and qualified for the playoffs for the first time since 1922. The ten-year drought was, and continues to be, the longest playoff drought in franchise history.

In the playoffs, the Argonauts won the Grey Cup Semi-Final 13–0 over the Western Canada champion Winnipeg 'Pegs. The Argonauts progressed to face the Ontario Rugby Football Union champion Sarnia Imperials in the 21st Grey Cup game, which was the first, and thus far only, Canadian championship game to be played in Sarnia, Ontario. The Argonauts won the championship and the club's third Grey Cup by a score of 4–3, which ties for the lowest scoring Grey Cup game ever.

Preseason
In the third annual City Championship preseason competition, the Argos reached the final and defeated the University of Toronto to claim the Reg DeGruchy Memorial Trophy for the second straight year.

Regular season
Prior to the 1933 season the league recognized that the Montreal Amateur Athletic Association had ended its involvement in the ownership and management of Montreal's Big Four club, thus consigning the Montreal AAA Winged Wheelers to history.

Standings

Schedule

Postseason
The Argonauts were obliged to relocate their home playoff game on November 18 to Hamilton due to the unavailability of Varsity Stadium, where the University of Toronto were hosting Queen's University in the 1933 intercollegiate football final.

Grey Cup

December 9 @ Davis Field (Attendance: 2,751)

References

Toronto Argonauts seasons
Grey Cup championship seasons